The Reynard 90D is a Formula 3000 car, designed and developed by Malcolm Oastler, and constructed and built by Reynard Motorsport, in 1990.

References 

Open wheel racing cars
International Formula 3000
Reynard Motorsport vehicles